Abigail Goodrich Whittlesey (Goodrich; November 29, 1788, Ridgefield, Connecticut - July 16, 1858, Colchester, Connecticut) was an American educator, magazine founder, and editor. In her publication, Mother's Magazine, she provided information and instructions on the role of mothers.

Early life and education
Abigail Goodrich was born in Ridgefield, Connecticut, November 29, 1788. She was the daughter of Samuel and Elizabeth Ely Goodrich. She was the elder sister of Samuel Griswold Goodrich. She was also sister to Charles A. Goodrich who became a Congregational minister. Her father served as pastor over the Congregational Church. The family removed to Berlin, Connecticut, where Whittlesey was chiefly educated.

Career
In 1808, she married Rev. Samuel Whittlesey, a Congregational minister, who served at New Preston, Connecticut for a decade, beginning in 1807. After Mr. Whittlesey, at his own request, received a dismission from his pastoral position at New Preston, he took charge of the "Deaf and Dumb Asylum," at Hartford, Connecticut, on April 30, 1817.

They lived from 1824 till 1828 in Canandaigua, New York, where Abigail worked as matron of the Ontario Female Seminary, managed by her husband, the principal. In 1828, they moved to Utica, New York to establish their own girls’ seminary. There, she saw the necessity for the development of female character and influence.

In January 1833, in Utica, she founded Mother's Magazine, which was affiliated with the Maternal Association, and published by her husband. She moved it to New York City in December of that year, after the Whittelseys moved there, with Abigail continuing as the editor. Through Whittlesey's influence and correspondence the Maternal Associations grew in number in the United States, in Europe, and other areas. The magazine reached a circulation of 10,000 in 1837. Her husband died in 1842 and Abigail was assisted by Reverend Darius Mead, her brother-in-law who was an editor of Christian Parlor Magazine. After Mother's Magazine was merged with the rival Mother's Journal and Family Visitant in 1848, Abigail resigned. In 1850, aided by her son, Henry, she launched Mrs. Whittelsey’s Magazine for Mothers which she kept up for two years. This magazine was limited to language of theology.

Personal life and death
The Whittleseys had seven children. She died in Colchester, Connecticut, July 16, 1858.

References

Attribution

Bibliography

External links
 
 

1788 births
1858 deaths
Educators from Connecticut
American magazine founders
American magazine editors
19th-century American women educators
Women magazine editors
19th-century American women writers
People from Ridgefield, Connecticut
Wikipedia articles incorporating text from A Woman of the Century
19th-century American educators
19th-century American businesspeople